The 2021 CECAFA U-23 Challenge Cup was 41st edition of the annual CECAFA Cup, an international football competition consisting of the national U-23 teams of member nations of the Council for East and Central Africa Football Associations (CECAFA). 

This year's tournament was reserved for U23 players but teams were allowed to field up to three players over 23.

It took place in Ethiopia from 17th July to 30th July 2021.

Uganda were the defending having won title in 2019. The Democratic Republic of the Congo participated as an invited team.

Participants
The FIFA World Ranking of participating Men's national football team as of 27 May 2021.

Venue
All matches are played at Bahir Dar International Stadium located in Bahir Dar, Ethiopia.

Match officials

Referees
 Ramadhan Kayoko (Tanzania)
 Thierry Nkurunziza (Burundi)
 Dickens Mimisa Nyagrowa (Kenya)
 Ronald Madanda (Uganda) 
 Yannick Malala Kabanga (DR Congo)
 Saddam Houssein Mansour (Djibouti)
 Teklu Mogos Tsegay  (Eritrea)
 Ring Malong (South Sudan)
 Haileyesus Bazezew Belete (Ethiopia)   
 

Assistant Referees
 Kassim Mpanga (Tanzania)
 Thierry Kakunze (Burundi)
 Stephen Yiembe Eliezah (Kenya)
 Ronald Katenya (Uganda) 
 Rachid Wais (Djibouti)
 Eyobel Michael Ghebru (Eritrea)
 Gasim Madir Dehiya (South Sudan)
 Fasika Biru Yehualashet (Ethiopia

Draw
The draw ceremony of the tournament took place on 13th July 2021 15:00 local time in Addis Ababa. Nine teams were divided into 3 groups. The top finisher in each group and the best second-placed finisher will qualify for the Semi-finals.

Groupings

Group stage

Tiebreakers
Teams are ranked according to points (3 points for a win, 1 point for a draw, 0 points for a loss), and if tied on points, the following tiebreaking criteria are applied, in the order given, to determine the rankings (Regulations Article 9.3)
Points in head-to-head matches among tied teams;
Goal difference in head-to-head matches among tied teams;
Goals scored in head-to-head matches among tied teams;
If more than two teams are tied, and after applying all head-to-head criteria above, a subset of teams are still tied, all head-to-head criteria above are reapplied exclusively to this subset of teams;
Goal difference in all group matches;
Goals scored in all group matches;
Penalty shoot-out if only two teams are tied and they met in the last round of the group;
Disciplinary points (yellow card = 1 point, red card as a result of two yellow cards = 3 points, direct red card = 3 points, yellow card followed by direct red card = 4 points);
Drawing of lots.

All matches will be held at Bahir Dar
Time listed are UTC+3:00

Group A

Group B

Group C

Knockout stage
In the knockout stage, extra-time and a penalty shoot-out will be used to decide the winner if necessary.

Bracket

Semi-finals

Third place match

Final

Statistics

Goalscorers

References

CECAFA Cup
CECAFA Cup
International association football competitions hosted by Ethiopia
CECAFA Cup
CECAFA